Neethan Shanmugarajah (born December 24, 1978), is a Canadian politician who represented Ward 42 Scarborough—Rouge River on Toronto City Council from 2017 to 2018. Shan was the first Tamil Canadian to sit on council.

Early life and family
Shan was born on December 24, 1978, in Jaffna in northern Sri Lanka. His father was from Neduntivu and his mother from Analaitivu. He moved to Canada as a refugee in 1995 aged 16. 

Shan is married to Thaadsha Navaneethan and has two sons.

Education and early career 
Shan completed an honours bachelor of science (BSc) from the University of Toronto in 2001 and a bachelor of education (BEd) from the Ontario Institute for Studies in Education (OISE) in 2003. He later received a master of education (MEd) in sociology and equity studies in education from OISE in 2012.

Shan began his career as a youth outreach worker in Malvern, Toronto. In 2001, aged 22, he became executive director of Canadian Tamil Youth Development Centre (CanTYD), a social service agency. He then became manager of youth programs at Malvern Family Resource Centre. In 2007 he became executive director of Council of Agencies Serving South Asians.

Shan was vice-chair of the National Council of Canadian Tamils and chair of the Tamil Heritage Month Committee, which he founded in 2009. He has served numerous other community groups including Better Ballot Initiative; Boreal Institute for Civil Society (project director); Canadian Tamil Congress; Community Use of Schools Council; Malvern Community Coalition; Parent Action on Drugs (project coordinator); Scarborough Youth Task Group; Tsunami Relief Coordinating Committee; and the Youth Gang Work Group. He is also involved with Canadian Multicultural Radio and Tamil Vision International.

Political career

Public school trustee 
Shan unsuccessfully ran for York Region District School Board (YRDSB) public school trustee for wards 7 and 8 in the 2003 Markham elections. He was later elected to the school board following the 2006 Markham election.

In January 2016, Shan was elected in a by-election to be the Toronto District School Board (TDSB) public school trustee for Ward 21 Scarborough—Rouge River. Shan assumed the trustee seat for Ward 17 in June 2022 after David Smith became the MPP for Scarborough Centre.

Provincial politics 
Shan took a leave of absence from the YRDSB to run in the 2007 provincial election as the Ontario New Democratic Party (NDP) candidate in Scarborough—Guildwood but failed to get elected and returned to the school board. He sought the Scarborough—Rouge River seat in the 2011 Ontario general election.

In April 2012, Shan was elected president of the Ontario New Democratic Party.

Shan ran in the 2014 Ontario general election as the NDP's candidate in Scarborough—Rouge River.  He contested the Ontario provincial by-election in Scarborough—Rouge River held in September 2016 as the NDP's candidate but again failed to get elected.

Shan was nominated as the Ontario New Democratic Party candidate in the provincial riding of Scarborough Centre for the 2022 Ontario general election, but again failed to win.

Toronto City Councillor 
Shan ran in the 2010 Toronto election as a candidate for Ward 42 Scarborough—Rouge River on Toronto City Council but failed to get elected. He ran again in the 2014 Toronto municipal election.

In February 2017, following the resignation of Councillor Raymond Cho, the Scarborough—Rouge River seat became vacant. Running in the subsequent by-election and was elected to Toronto City Council, becoming the first Tamil Canadian to serve on the council. He ran for re-election in the 2018 municipal election in the new Ward 25 Scarborough—Rouge Park after the province aligned Toronto's 44 wards to match the federal and provincial electoral divisions. He was ultimately defeated by newcomer Jennifer McKelvie by 154 votes.

Electoral record

Ontario Legislative Assembly 

	
	

	

		

|align="left" colspan=2|Liberal notional hold
|align="right"|Swing
|align="right"| -4.02
|

Toronto City Council

Toronto District School Board

York Region District School Board

References

Notes 

1978 births
21st-century Canadian politicians
Canadian community activists
Canadian people of Sri Lankan Tamil descent
Living people
Ontario New Democratic Party candidates in Ontario provincial elections
People from Jaffna
Sri Lankan emigrants to Canada
Sri Lankan Tamil activists
Sri Lankan Tamil politicians
Sri Lankan Tamil teachers
Toronto city councillors
Toronto District School Board trustees
University of Toronto alumni
Canadian politicians of Sri Lankan descent